Madrid Dome (‘Kupol Madrid’ \'ku-pol ma-'drid\) is the ice dome rising to 1647 m at the southwest extremity of Aristotle Mountains on Oscar II Coast, Graham Land in Antarctica.  It is surmounting Crane Glacier to the northwest and Flask Glacier to the south.

The feature is named after the capital city of Spain, in connection with the Madrid Protocol on Environmental Protection to the Antarctic Treaty.

Location
British mapping in 1976.

Maps
 Antarctic Digital Database (ADD). Scale 1:250000 topographic map of Antarctica. Scientific Committee on Antarctic Research (SCAR). Since 1993, regularly upgraded and updated.

Notes

References
 Madrid Dome. SCAR Composite Antarctic Gazetteer.
 Bulgarian Antarctic Gazetteer. Antarctic Place-names Commission. (details in Bulgarian, basic data in English)

Mountains of Graham Land
Oscar II Coast
Bulgaria and the Antarctic